Archives, Vol. 1 is a 2001 compilation album by Delerium. It was released on Nettwerk Records a few months after being released in the UK. It incorporates tracks from four of their earlier albums: Faces, Forms and Illusions, Morpheus, Syrophenikan and Stone Tower.

Track listing

Disc one

Faces, Forms and Illusions
 "Monuments of Deceit" (Co-written by Michael Balch) – 4:16
 "Inside the Chamber" – 6:19
 "Sword of Islam" – 4:14
 "New Dawn" – 4:54
 "Siege of Atrocity" – 7:45

Morpheus
 "Morpheus" – 4:54
 "Faith" – 4:44
 "Temple of Light" – 5:37
 "Somnolent" – 4:34
 "Allurance" – 4:19
 "Fragments of Fear" – 3:56
 "Symbolism" – 6:40

Disc two

Syrophenikan
 "Embodying" – 5:05
 "Shroud" – 4:45
 "Of the Tribe" – 5:10
 "Mythos" – 6:19
 "Prophecy" (This song is mislabeled as "Twilight Ritual") – 5:18

Stone Tower
 "Bleeding" – 8:00
 "Tundra" – 8:56
 "Sphere" – 5:53
 "Embryo" – 4:18

Delerium albums
2001 compilation albums